Nguyễn Xuân Thành (born November 10, 1985 in  Vietnam) is a Vietnamese footballer who is a left back, left midfielder for Thanh Hoa FC.

External links 

1985 births
Living people
Vietnamese footballers
Vietnam international footballers
V.League 1 players
Hanoi FC players
Thanh Hóa FC players
Becamex Binh Duong FC players
Association football midfielders